Tengis River is a river in the Tsagaannuur sum of Khövsgöl aimag in northern Mongolia. It runs through the western part of "East Taiga", the northern extension of the Darkhad valley. The river starts near the Russian border, in the northernmost tip of Mongolia. It ends as a right hand tributary of the Little Yenisey (Shishged Gol).

References

See also 
List of rivers of Mongolia

Rivers of Mongolia